Bay de L'Eau Island is an abandoned community in Newfoundland and Labrador.

See also
 List of ghost towns in Newfoundland and Labrador

Ghost towns in Newfoundland and Labrador